Ammas (also written Ammes) is a village in the commune of El Ouata, in Béchar Province, Algeria. It is connected to El Ouata by a local road along the side of the river, along with the other villages El Maffa, Aguedal and El Beïda.

References

Neighbouring towns and cities

Populated places in Béchar Province